The Ministry of Energy, Tourism and Digital Agenda (MINETAD) was a department of the Government of Spain which existed between 2016 and 2018 responsible for the proposal and execution of the government policy on energy, tourism, telecoms, information society and Digital Agenda.

The Ministry was created for the first time in late 2016 assuming the powers of the Industry Ministry on energy, tourism and telecoms. However, it was dissolved in 2018 after the motion of no confidence against Rajoy's Second Government and its competences were distributed between three ministries: the Ministry for the Ecological Transition, the Ministry of Industry, Trade and Tourism and the Ministry of Economy and Enterprise.

Structure
The Department of Energy, Tourism and Digital Agenda was structured in four higher bodies:
 The Secretariat of State for Energy, responsible for the government policy on energy.
 The Secretariat of State for the Information Society and the Digital Agenda, responsible for the government policy on telecommunications and digital agenda.
 The Secretariat of State for Tourism, responsible for the government policy on tourism.
The Undersecretariat of Energy, Tourism and Digital Agenda, responsible for the day-to-day management of the Ministry.

List of Ministers

Since November 4, 2016 to June 7, 2018, the Minister was Álvaro Nadal, previous Director-General of the Economic Office of the Spanish Prime Minister.

References 

Industry ministers of Spain
Defunct departments of the Spanish Government
Spain
Tourism ministries
Spain